Cheikh Rasaa Mosque is a Tunisian mosque in the north of the Medina of Tunis.
It does not exist anymore.

Localization

The mosque was near Souk En Nhas in the Hafsia district.

Etymology
It was named after the saint Cheikh Rasaa, one of the Imams of Al-Zaytuna Mosque, who died in 1489.

History
The mosque was built during the Hafsid era. It has a hall and the tomb of its founder.

References

Mosques in Tunis